The X-ray Polarimeter Satellite (XPoSat) is a ISRO planned space observatory to study polarisation of cosmic X-rays. It is planned to be launched in Q2 2023 on a Small Satellite Launch Vehicle (SSLV), with mission life of at least five years.

The telescope is being developed by the Indian Space Research Organisation (ISRO) and the Raman Research Institute.

Overview 
Studying how radiation is polarised gives away the nature of its source, including the strength and distribution of its magnetic fields and the nature of other radiation around it. XPoSat will study the 50 brightest known sources in the universe, including pulsars, black hole X-ray binaries, active galactic nuclei, and non-thermal supernova remnants.

History 
Preliminary Design Review (PDR) of the XPoSat including the POLIX payload was completed in September 2018, followed by preparation of POLIX Qualification Model and beginning of some of its Flight Model components fabrication.

Payloads 
Two payloads of XPoSat are hosted on a modified IMS-2 satellite bus. Primary scientific payload is Polarimeter Instrument in X-rays (POLIX), which will study the degree and angle of polarisation of bright astronomical X-ray sources in the energy range 8-30 keV. POLIX, a  instrument, is being developed by the Raman Research Institute.

Polarimeter Instrument in X-rays (POLIX)

POLIX is the primary scientific payload aboard XPoSat. It is a Thomson X-ray polarimeter, which measures the degree and angle of polarization (polarimetry parameters) of astronomical sources in the medium X-ray range (5-30 keV). It has been developed by Raman Research Institute.

Its science objectives are to measure:
 the strength and the distribution of magnetic field in the sources
 geometric anisotropies in the sources
 their alignment with respect to the line of sight
 the nature of the accelerator responsible for energising the electrons taking part in radiation and scattering.
The experiment conﬁguration consists of a collimator, central low Z (Lithium, Lithium Hydride or Beryllium) scatterer surrounded by xenon ﬁlled X-ray proportional counters as X-ray detectors which collects the scattered X-ray photons. The instrument is rotated along the viewing axis leading to the measurement of the azimuthal distribution of the scattered X-ray photons which gives information on polarisation. Polarised X-rays will produce an azimuthal modulation in the count rate as opposed to uniform azimuthal distribution of count rate for unpolarised X-rays. POLIX has four independent detectors, each with its own front end and processing electronics. Localization of the X-ray photon in the detectors is carried out by the method of charge division in a set of resistive anode wires connected in series.

The prime objects for observation with this instrument are the X-ray bright accretion powered neutron stars, accreting black holes in different spectral states, rotation powered pulsars, magnetars, and active galactic nuclei. This instrument bridges an energy gap in detection capability, between the soft X-ray polarimeters utilising Bragg reflection (OSO-8) or Photoelectron tracks (IXPE), and hard X-ray polarimeters using Compton scattering such as the Cadmium Zinc Telluride Imager (CZTI) on Astrosat.

X-ray Spectroscopy and Timing (XSPECT)

XSPECT is the secondary payload on XPoSat. It measures spectroscopic information and timing of soft X-rays . XSPECT is designed to pursue timing studies of soft X-rays (0.8-15 keV), complementary to what the Large Area X-ray Proportional Counter (LAXPC) does at high energies on AstroSat, while simultaneously providing adequate spectral resolution in the 1-20 keV band. It has an energy resolution of <200 eV at 5.9keV (-20 °C) and a timing resolution of ~2 msec. It has been developed by the Space Astronomy Group, URSC.

The detector achieves modest effective area without the use of focusing optics using the large area Swept Charge Devices (SCD), a variant of X-ray CCDs. SCDs permit fast readouts (10–100 kHz) and moderately good spectral resolution at the cost of a position sensitivity. These devices are unique in requiring very benign cooling requirement (requiring only passive cooling) unlike traditional X-ray CCDs.

Key science objectives of XSPECT include understanding long-term behavior of x-ray sources through correlation of timing characteristics with spectral state changes and emission line variations.

See also 

 Imaging X-ray Polarimetry Explorer
 List of X-ray space telescopes
 X-ray astronomy satellite
 X-ray telescope

References 

X-ray telescopes
Space telescopes
Satellites of India
2023 in India
2023 in spaceflight